"Fool's Gold" is a song by Australian singer songwriter, Jack River. It was released in June 2017 as the lead single from River's debut studio album, Sugar Mountain. It was certified platinum in Australia in 2020.

Jack River said "I was alone in New York, chasing shiny things. The verses were spinning around my head. I was annoyed at myself for falling for the same things over again without them giving back. But I also knew how human it was to feel like that, and how I'd probably come up against this feeling again and again. I wanted to write a song for that emotion – the relentless humanity in thinking something is gold when it just isn't."

Certifications

References

2017 singles
2017 songs
Jack River (musician) songs
Songs written by Jack River (musician)